"Bug" is the ninth episode of the fourth season of the American television drama series Breaking Bad, and the 42nd overall episode of the series. It originally aired on AMC in the United States on September 11, 2011.

Plot 
Hank Schrader retrieves the GPS tracker that he planted on Gus Fring's car. Disappointed that it did not pick up anything suspicious, he decides to investigate the distribution center that Gus owns. Walter White warns Mike Ehrmantraut of this but asks him not to hurt Hank. Walter later meets with Jesse Pinkman and again expresses dissatisfaction that he has not yet killed Gus.

Skyler White tells Walter the car wash is doing so well that he may be able to quit cooking meth. Ted Beneke, Skyler's old boss with whom she had an affair, arrives at the car wash and tells her that he is being audited for tax fraud. Since she was aware of the ongoing fraud and as his former bookkeeper signed off on the books, Skyler could also be implicated. She attends Ted's audit and pretends to be oblivious, underqualified, and completely ignorant of accounting practices. Now, believing the fraud was simply massive ignorance, the special agent drops any potential prison time for Ted, but he is still ordered to pay back taxes and fined more money than he can afford. Skyler later ventures into the crawl space underneath the White residence, suggesting she is intending to draw out cash from Walter's stash to cover Ted's crippling $600,000 IRS bill. Meanwhile, Walter sees Tyrus Kitt outside of Hank's house and calls the police, forcing Tyrus to leave.

A cartel sniper opens fire on the distribution center, killing a henchman and firing on others, including Mike and Jesse, until Gus walks out and stands in the line of fire with his arms outstretched. Mike later explains to Jesse that the cartel needs to keep Gus alive for his distribution network. They bring the dead henchman to the lab to dissolve his body in acid and Mike threatens to kill Walter if he ever calls the police on Mike's people again. At Gus's house, Gus tells Jesse that he has given in to the cartel's demands to split territory and that Jesse will be sent to Mexico to teach them how to cook the blue meth. Jesse has an opportunity to poison the stew that Gus makes but decides not to risk it.

An overwhelmed Jesse meets with Walter and begs him for help about cooking meth for the cartel, but lies about seeing Gus. Walter ignores Jesse's pleas and reveals that he put a GPS tracker on Jesse's car and knew that he was in Gus's house. He begins to confront Jesse for failing to kill Gus, but a furious Jesse, feeling betrayed, throws the GPS tracker at Walter's head. Walt furiously rushes Jesse and they engage in a brutal fight, wrecking the living room before Jesse gains the upper hand. Jesse gets to his feet and tells Walter to leave his house and never return.

Production 
"Bug" is the last episode of the series to feature the Los Pollos Hermanos restaurant. The restaurant was used many times as an important plot device for its owner Gustavo Fring. The restaurant would not be used again until the third season of Better Call Saul ("Witness").

Reception 
Donna Bowman of The A.V. Club gave the episode a "B+". She said several Rubicons are crossed, including "three enormous, no-going-back decisions" three of the characters have to make.

In 2019 The Ringer ranked "Bug" 61st out of 62 total Breaking Bad episodes.

References

External links 
"Bug" at the official Breaking Bad site

2011 American television episodes
Breaking Bad (season 4) episodes